The Critics' Choice Television Award for Best Actress in a Drama Series is an award presented annually by the Critics' Choice Television Awards to recognize the work of television actresses in the drama genre. It was introduced in 2011, when the awards ceremony was first initiated. The winners are voted for by television critics who are members of the Broadcast Television Critics Association.

Winners and nominees

2010s

2020s

Multiple wins
2 wins
 Tatiana Maslany (consecutive)

Multiple nominations
5 nominations
 Christine Baranski
 Julianna Margulies
 Elisabeth Moss
 Keri Russell

4 nominations
 Tatiana Maslany

3 nominations
 Claire Danes
 Viola Davis
 Vera Farmiga
 Robin Wright

2 nominations
 Caitriona Balfe
 Olivia Colman
 Jodie Comer
 Eva Green
 Taraji P. Henson
 Laura Linney
 Michaela Jaé Rodriguez
 Katey Sagal
 Zendaya

See also
 TCA Award for Individual Achievement in Drama
 Golden Globe Award for Best Actress – Television Series Drama
 Primetime Emmy Award for Outstanding Lead Actress in a Drama Series
 Screen Actors Guild Award for Outstanding Performance by a Female Actor in a Drama Series

References

External links
 

Critics' Choice Television Awards
Television awards for Best Actress